Plegma caelatura is a species of minute, air-breathing land snail, a terrestrial pulmonate gastropod mollusk in the family Euconulidae. This species is endemic to Réunion.

References

External links

Endemic fauna of Réunion
Molluscs of Réunion
Helicarionidae